Stephenville is a city in and the county seat of Erath County, Texas, United States. It is on the North Bosque River, which forms nearby. Founded in 1854, it is home to Tarleton State University. As of the 2020 census, the city's population was 20,847, and it is the principal city in the Stephenville Micropolitan Statistical Area. Stephenville is among several communities that call themselves the "Cowboy Capital of the World".

History

 
Stephenville is named after John M. Stephen, who settled there in 1854, and donated the land for the townsite laid out by George B. Erath when the county was organized in 1856. In the first two years of its settlement, the population increased to 776. The population then declined until 1871, because the townsite was in Comanche territory and raids were common, and because the hardships of the American Civil War led citizens to leave. The population grew after Stephenville became an agriculture and livestock center. Coal mining also became important to the area in 1886, and was a major segment of the economy for the 30 years.

Stephenville was incorporated in 1889, with the arrival of the Fort Worth and Rio Grande Railway. In the 1890s, many of the buildings around the town square were built, Tarleton State University opened, and the community's two newspapers merged to become the Empire-Tribune, which is still in operation. In February 1907, the Stephenville North and South Texas Railway was chartered by Stephenville and Hamilton business interests, which sold the line in 1910 to the St. Louis Southwestern Railway of Texas system. In the 20th century, industry became an important part of Stephenville, and the population has steadily increased since the 1920s.

Geography

Stephenville is served by three major US highways – US Highway 377, US Highway 281, and US Highway 67 (which joins into US Hwy 377).

Climate

The climate in this area is characterized by hot, humid summers and generally mild to cool winters. According to the Köppen climate classification system, Stephenville has a humid subtropical climate, Cfa on climate maps.

Demographics

2020 census

As of the 2020 United States census, there were 20,897 people, 7,291 households, and 3,771 families residing in the city. The population density was 1,440.4 people per square mile (556.1/km). The 7,579 housing units averaged 637.4 per square mile (246.1/km). Of the 7,291 households, 25.2% had children under the age of 18 living with them, 37.1% were married couples living together, 8.8% had a female householder with no husband present, and 50.2% were not families. About 33.1% of all households were made up of individuals, and 10.1% had someone living alone who was 65 years of age or older. The average household size was 2.27 and the average family size was 2.99.

In the city, the population was distributed as 27.8% under the age of 19, 21.4% from 20 to 24, 22.2% from 25 to 44, 17.2% from 45 to 64, and 11.2% who were 65 years of age or older. The median age was 25.3 years. There were 8,130 males and 8,933 females.

The median income for a household in the city was $33,175, and the median income for a family was $52,320. Males had a median income of $36,139 versus $30,007 for females. The per capita income for the city was $19,596. About 13.6% of families and 26.2% of the population were below the poverty line, including 23.1% of those under age 18 and 14.3% of those age 65 or over.

Education

Public library

 Stephenville Public Library

Public schools

 Stephenville Independent School District
 Stephenville High School (grades 9–12)
 Henderson Jr. High School (grades 7–8)
 Gilbert Intermediate School (grades 5–6)
 Hook Elementary School (grades 3–4)
 Chamberlin Elementary School (grades 1–2)
 Central Elementary School (grades Pre-K–K)
 Huston Academy (grades 7–12) (previously Erath Excels! Academy)

Postsecondary education

 Tarleton State University (member of the Texas A&M University System)
 Ranger College (Erath County Center)

Notable people

 Jessie G. Beach (1887 – 1954), paleontologist and museum aid, born in Stephenville.
 Art Briles, former football coach at Baylor University
 Dustin Hodge, television producer and writer
 Brock Holt, professional baseball player, graduated from Stephenville High School
 Jewel (singer), singer-songwriter, lived on a Stephenville ranch while married to Ty Murray. She refers to the town in the song "Stephenville, TX".
 Kevin Kolb, NFL quarterback
 Jess Lockwood, world champion bull rider
 J.B. Mauney, professional rodeo cowboy
 Ty Murray, world champion rodeo cowboy
 Carey Wentworth Styles, newspaperman, founder of The Atlanta Constitution, editor, managing editor, or special writer at "more than a dozen Texas dailies and weeklies." West End Cemetery
 Hugh Wolfe, professional football player

References

External links

 Stephenville Official City Site

Cities in Erath County, Texas
Cities in Texas
County seats in Texas
Micropolitan areas of Texas
Populated places established in 1856
1856 establishments in Texas